Snowshoe Pass is a snow saddle 4 nautical miles (7 km) northeast of Aurora Heights, between Argosy and Skua Glaciers in the Miller Range. It was discovered and named by the northern party of the New Zealand Geological Survey Antarctic Expedition (NZGSAE) (1961–62), who found the deep soft snow here made snowshoeing the best method of travel.

Mountain passes of Antarctica
Landforms of Oates Land